The Typist Gets Married (French: La dactylo se marie) is a 1934 French-German comedy film directed by Joe May and René Pujol and starring Marie Glory, Jean Murat and Armand Bernard. It was a sequel to the 1931 film The Typist which also starred Glory.

The film's sets were designed by Max Heilbronner.

Cast
Marie Glory as Simone  
Jean Murat as Paul Derval  
Armand Bernard as Jules Fanfarel 
Mady Berry as Thérèse  
André Berley as Bloch  
Marcel Maupi as chauffeur  
Palau 
Rognoni as Gaillard  
Léon Larive as hotel's doorman
Pierre Huchet as commissioner
Nichette Yvon
Teddy Dargy as Bloch
Lucien Pardies
Andrée Dorns

References

External links

French comedy films
German comedy films
1934 comedy films
Films directed by René Pujol
Films directed by Joe May
French sequel films
Films with screenplays by Franz Schulz
Films with screenplays by Joe May
Pathé films
Films scored by Paul Abraham
French black-and-white films
German black-and-white films
1930s French-language films
1930s French films
1930s German films
French-language German films